Besim Fagu (10 March 1925 – 1 January 1999) was an Albanian football player who played for 17 Nentori Tiranë and Partizani Tirana where he won seven National Championships. He was also a member of the Albania national team between 1946 and 1953, where he earned 11 caps and also won the 1946 Balkan Cup.

International career
He made his debut for Albania in an October 1946 Balkan Cup match against Bulgaria and earned a total of 11 caps, scoring no goals. His final international was a May 1958 friendly match against East Germany.

Personal life

Legacy
On 10 March 2015, on the 90th anniversary of his birthdate, he was awarded with a medal of gratitude by the Ministry of Defence at an event organised to commemorate the player.

Honours
Kategoria Superiore (7): 1947, 1948, 1949, 1954, 1957, 1958, 1959.

References

1925 births
1999 deaths
Footballers from Tirana
Albanian footballers
Association football defenders
Albania international footballers
KF Tirana players
FK Partizani Tirana players
Kategoria Superiore players